Brian O'Shaughnessy (5 May 1931 – 19 June 2001) was a British-born film actor. He was born in Aldershot, Hampshire, in 1931, but was evacuated during the Second World War to South Africa, where he later found fame as an actor.

Selected filmography

Film

 Stropers van die Laeveld (1962)
 Die Ruiter in die Nag (1963) - Captain Ricky
 Seven Against the Sun (1964) - Sgt. Macarthy
 Diamond Walkers (1965) - Sergeant Barrett
 African Gold (1965) - Mac
 Die Wonderwêreld van Kammie Kamfer (1965) 
 Sandy the Seal (filmed in 1965, released in 1969) - Mackenzie
 Der Rivonia-Prozess (1966) - Harold Wolpe
 Kavaliers (1966) - Capt. Ronald Rogers
 The Professor and the Beauty Queen (1967) - Eric
 Rider in the Night (1968)
 Dr Kalie (1968) - Peter Vané
 Danie Bosman: Die verhaal van die grootste SA komponis (1969) - Dr. Rodney Masters
 Strangers at Sunrise (1969) - Corporal Caine
 Satan's Harvest (1970) - Andrew Murdock
 Shangani Patrol (1970) - Maj. Allan Wilson
 Mister Kingstreet's War (1971) - Morgan Kingstreet 
 Pressure Burst (1971) - Ted Prentiss
 Creatures the World Forgot (1971) - Mak - The Father
 Z.E.B.R.A. (1971) - de Jager, Minister of Justice (English version) (voice, uncredited)
 The Last Lion (1972) - David Lang (voice, uncredited)
 Rogue Lion (1972) - Alec Dudley
 Met Moed, Durf en Bloed (1973) - Dr. Keith Peters (Story two: The Rough! - 'Female of the Species')
 Fraud! (1974) - Robert Curtis
 Vreemde Wêreld (1974) - Dr. Page
 Mister Deathman (1977) - Colonel Duncan
 Slavers (1978) - Dr. O'Connor
 Decision to Die (1978) - Dr. Leon Walters
 Zulu Dawn (1979) - Maj. Smith R.A. 
 The Gods Must Be Crazy (1980) - Mr. Thompson
 The Gordimer Stories (1982) - Mr. Eysendyk (segment "Country Lovers")
 Claws (1982) - Bart Williams
 Go for the Gold (1984) - Stan Hopkins
 Morenga (1985) - Herr Lüdemann
 Operation Hit Squad (1987) - Richard
 Quest for Love (1988) - Brian
 The Emissary (1988) - KGB General
 White Ghost (1988) - John Enrlich 
 Rage to Kill (1988) - General Hardisty
 Mutator (1989) - Axelrod
 The Evil Below (1989) - Father Shannon
 Brutal Glory (1989) - James Grouper
 That Englishwoman: An Account of the Life of Emily Hobhouse  (1990) - Major
 Act of Piracy (1990) - Major Ellis
 The Power of One (1992) - Col. Bretyn
 The Visual Bible: Matthew (1993) - Pontius Pilate
 Arende (1994) - Sgt. Stewart
 Trigger Fast (1994) - Colonel Jackson
 Hearts & Minds (1995) - Col. van Vuuren
 Warhead (1996) - Gen. Edwards
 Orion's Key (1996) - Professor Morton
 Operation Delta Force 3: Clear Target (1998) - Admiral Norman Henshaw
  (2000) - Pilot
 Isfahan (2001) - Carrigan (final film role)

Television
 Dr. med. Mark Wedmann - Detektiv inbegriffen (1974) - Dr. Frank
  (1974)
 Tatort (1976) - Piet Brügge
 The Villagers (1976)
 Pour tout l'or du Transvaal (1979) - Browels
 Auf Achse (1983) - Smidson
 Cape Rebel (1989)
 The Emiss1997-1998ary (1989)
 Young Survivors (1990) - Diamond police
 The Fourth Reich (1990)
 Arende II (1992) - Sgt. Stewart
 Arende III (1993) - Sgt. Stewart
 Death in the Family (1993) - Frederick du Plessis
 Kap der guten Hoffnung (1997) - Ruben
 Operation Delta Force 2: Mayday (1997) - Admiral Norman Henshaw
 The Adventures of Sinbad (1997-1998) - Kasha / Omar
 CI5: The New Professionals (1999) - Mavoy
 Die Spesenritter (1999)
 Die Wüstenrose (2000) - Dr. Hermann Kummerow
 The Diamond Hunters  (2001) - Michael Shapiro

References

External links
 

1931 births
2001 deaths
South African  male film actors
English emigrants to South Africa
White South African people
South African radio personalities